Glauert may refer to:

People:
Hermann Glauert, FRS (born 1892), British aerodynamicist, Principal Scientific Officer of the Royal Aircraft Establishment, Farnborough until 1934
Ludwig Glauert (1879–1963), British-born Australian paleontologist, herpetologist and museum curator

Animals:
Glauert's anglerfish (Allenichthys glauerti), an anglerfish that is unique to its genus
Glauert's froglet (Crinia glauerti), a species of frog in the family Myobatrachidae

Technology:
Prandtl–Glauert transformation, approximation function which allows to compare aerodynamical processes occurring at different Mach numbers
Prandtl–Glauert singularity, drop in air pressure around an aircraft at transonic speeds causing  a visible condensation cloud